Leticia Judith Murray Acedo (born June 28, 1979, in Hermosillo) is a Mexican actress and beauty pageant titleholder who represented her country in Miss Universe 2000 and Miss International 2000.

Nuestra Belleza Mexico
Murray competed in 1999 as the delegate from Sonora in her country's national beauty pageant, Nuestra Belleza México, after winning her state pageant on June 4, 1999.

A few months later, on 10 September 1999, in Pachuca, Hidalgo, she gained the right to represent Mexico in Miss Universe 2000 after being crowned Nuestra Belleza México 1999.

Miss Universe 2000
As the official representative of her country to the 2000 Miss Universe pageant, broadcast live on May 12, 2000, from Nicosia, Cyprus, Murray obtained the Best National Costume and Clairol Herbal Essences Style awards.

Miss International 2000
Murray also represented her country in Miss International 2000 and became one of the Top 15 semifinalists.

References

External links
Official Nuestra Belleza Mexico website - Past titleholders

]

1979 births
Living people
Mexican people of Scottish descent
Miss International 2000 delegates
Miss Universe 2000 contestants
Nuestra Belleza México winners
People from Hermosillo
Mexican people of Irish descent